The Beaufort Football Netball Club is an Australian rules football and netball club from Beaufort which competes in the Central Highlands Football League. They previously played in the Ballarat Football League and Lexton Football League.

Senior Premierships
Beaufort & District Football Competition (1898 - 1903)
 1898 def Middle Creek
 1902 def Skipton
Buangor & District Football Association (1922 - 1923)
 1922 def Buangor
Ripon Football Association (1924-1925, 1938-1940)
 1924 def Waterloo
 1925 def Raglan
 1938 def Elmhurst
 1940 def Elmhurst
Beaufort & District Football Association (1932-1933)
 1932 def Raglan
 1933 def Raglan
Learmonth District Football Association (1920–1921, 1926–1931, 1934)
 1926 def Lexton
 1928 def Burrumbeet
 1930 def Avoca
 1934 def Waubra
Lexton Football League (1946–1965)
 1964 def Lexton
 1965 def Navarre
Ballarat Football League (1966–1993)
 1969 def East Ballarat
Central Highlands Football League (1994- )
 1995 def Dunnstown
 1996 def Dunnstown
 2018 def Buninyong

VFL/AFL players

Alex Sinclair - 
Edgar Stubbs - 
Stuart Atkin - 
  David Norman   Collingwood
Gary Lofts - 
Jamie Bond - 
Shane O'Bree - , 
 Brad Crouch - Adelaide Crows, St.Kilda
 Matt Crouch - Adelaide Crows

Book
History of Football in the Ballarat District  by John Stoward -

References

External links

 

Ballarat Football League clubs
1880s establishments in Australia